Acrida exaltata is a species of grasshopper in the family Acrididae. It is a pest of sorghum in Asia.

References

exaltata
Insect pests of millets